Ghazanfar Abbas Chheena is a Pakistani politician who had been a member of the Provincial Assembly of the Punjab from August 2018 to January 2023. He was also the member of the Provincial Assembly of the Punjab  from May 2013 to May 2018.

Early life and education
He was born on 15 December 1962 in Hyderabad, Pakistan.

He has a degree of Master of Arts and a degree of Bachelor of Laws.

Political career
He was elected to the Provincial Assembly of the Punjab as an independent candidate from Constituency PP-49 (Bhakkar-III) in 2013 Pakistani general election. He joined Pakistan Muslim League (N) (PML-N) in May 2013.

In May 2018, he quit PML-N and joined Pakistan Tehreek-e-Insaf (PTI).

He was re-elected to Provincial Assembly of the Punjab as a candidate of PTI from Constituency PP-91 (Bhakkar-III) in 2018 Pakistani general election.

References

Living people
Punjab MPAs 2013–2018
1962 births
Pakistan Muslim League (N) politicians
Punjab MPAs 2018–2023
Pakistan Tehreek-e-Insaf MPAs (Punjab)